is a Japanese actor and singer. He is one of Japan's 11 most popular male entertainers, according to an NHK survey taken in 2004.

Biography
Oda was born in Kawasaki, Kanagawa. In the late 1980s, he launched his career with the release of two singles on records.

In 1989, he appeared in the television drama Mama Haha Boogie, from which point he started to gain popularity as an actor, which also brought attention to his singing aspirations.

In 1991, he appeared in the enormously popular television drama Tokyo Love Story, a breakout role. He then became a leading man in Japanese film and television, generally playing the role of a sympathetic character.

His most famous role is that of Aoshima, a police detective in the Bayside Shakedown film and television drama series.

Filmography

Film

Television

Discography

Albums

Singles

Awards
 1991: Blue Ribbon Awards - Most Popular Actor
 1999: Blue Ribbon Awards - Best Actor for Bayside Shakedown
 2003: Japanese Academy Awards - Best Actor for T.R.Y.
 Hochi Film Award - Best Actor

References

External links
 Official website
 
 
 Yuji Oda on JDorama
 Yuji Oda on Universal Music Japan

1967 births
Living people
People from Kawasaki, Kanagawa
Japanese male film actors
20th-century Japanese male actors
21st-century Japanese male actors
Japanese male pop singers
Japanese male television actors
Musicians from Kanagawa Prefecture